Lost Love (also spelled Perduto amor) is a 2003  Italian autobiographical drama film. It marked the directorial debut of singer-songwriter Franco Battiato. For this film Battiato won the Nastro d'Argento for best new director.

Cast 

Corrado Fortuna as Ettore 
Donatella Finocchiaro as Mary
Anna Maria Gherardi as Augusta
Lucia Sardo as Nerina
Ninni Bruschetta as Luigi
Tiziana Lodato as "La Vivace"
Gabriele Ferzetti as Tommaso Pasini
Nicole Grimaudo as Raffaella
Rada Rassimov as Clara Pasini
Luca Vitrano as Ettore as a child
Manlio Sgalambro as Martino Alliata
Elisabetta Sgarbi as Elisabetta Gaia
Francesco De Gregori as Francesco D

See also
List of Italian films of 2003

References

External links

2003 films
Italian drama films
2003 drama films
Films set in Sicily
2003 directorial debut films
2000s Italian films